Kidz/Animez was a children's and anime channel. It was established on 3 February 2012. Kidz/Animez broadcasts between 00:30 to 23:00 and between 23:00 to 00:30 in Animez broadcasts.

On February 1, 2019, Kidz/Animez closed down.

Programs

Preschool series

Cartoon series

Series

Animez block

Short cartoon series 

Defunct television channels in Turkey
Television stations in Turkey
Children's television networks
Children's television channels in Turkey
Television channels and stations established in 2012
Television channels and stations disestablished in 2019
Anime television